Ganesh Vaidyanathan is the Professor of Decision Sciences department in the Judd Leighton School of Business and Economics, Indiana University South Bend. He served as the Chair of the Decision Sciences (2014-2015) and the Director of the Master of Science in MIS (MS-MIT) program (2007-2015). He directed the Center of Experiential Education (2006-2010). He has also served as the Vice-President and member of the Senate Executive Committee, the Co-Chair of the Senate Budget Committee, and a member of the Assessment and Planning Committee for the school’s AACSB accreditation. He earned his MBA (1998) from the University of Chicago and his doctoral degree (1989) in Artificial Intelligence from Tulane University.

Research career 
Ganesh Vaidyanathan has made significant research contributions to Operations Management and e-Commerce, seeking to advance their interfaces in corporations. He has authored more than 30 publications and book chapters in operations management, information systems, and project management areas in journals such as Journal of Operations Management, Communications of the ACM, and Decision Sciences. His book, “Project Management: Process, Technology and Practice”, published by Pearson Prentice-Hall, has been adopted as textbook in more than 50 universities.

Authored Books 
Project Management: Process, Technology and Practice, Prentice Hall-Pearson, 2013.

Recent Publications 
 Capability Hierarchy in Electronic Procurement and Procurement Process Performance: An empirical Analysis. Journal of Operations Management, 31(6), 2013, 376-390.
 Effect of Purchase Volume Flexibility and Purchase Mix Flexibility on E-procurement Performance: An Analysis of Two Perspectives. Journal of Operations Management, 30(7-8), 2012, 509-520.
 Does Security Impact E-Procurement Performance? Testing a Model of Direct and Moderated Effects. Decision Sciences, 43(3), 2012, 437-458.
 Security in Web Content Management Systems Applications: A Framework Based Evaluation. Communications of the ACM, 52(12), 2009,1-6.
 The Role of Quality in e-Procurement Information, Fulfillment and Performance: An empirical Analysis.  Journal of Operations Management, 26(3), 2008, 407-425.
 A framework for evaluating third-party logistics. Communications of the ACM, 48(1), 2005, 89-94.
 A five factor framework for analyzing online risks in e-business. Communications of the ACM, 46(12), 2003, 354-361.

References

External links 
 Judd Leighton School of Business and Economics
 Ganesh Vaidynathan profile (Indiana University South Bend)

Year of birth missing (living people)
Living people
American business theorists